Tom Geerd Geurts (born in Dedemsvaart on April 2, 1964) is a Dutch economist currently employed by The George Washington University and an Honorary Professor at the Technische Universität Berlin. Current Chair of the Education Committee of the American Real Estate Society (ARES), and previously Director of Academic Affairs of the Schack institute of New York University. He wrote numerous presentations and publications in the field of Real Estate and Finance, for example in the field of Security Market Line. He is the son of Joop Geurts.

References

External links
 Tom G. Geurts at the George Washington University

1964 births
Living people
Dutch economists
George Washington University faculty
People from Avereest